Qaracüzlü (also, Kara-Dzhuzli and Karadzhyuzlyu) is a village and municipality in the Gobustan Rayon of Azerbaijan.  It has a population of 215.

References 

Populated places in Gobustan District